Hawza, also Haouza or Hausa, is a town in Western Sahara on the Morocco side of the Wall. According to the 2004 census it has a population of 8,769 people.

Sister cities
 - Le Mans, France

External links
Census information

Populated places in Laâyoune-Sakia El Hamra
Populated places in Western Sahara
Es Semara Province